USS Mullinnix (DD-944) was a  of the United States Navy. She was named for Admiral Henry M. Mullinnix USN (1892–1943), who was killed in action during World War II, when the aircraft carrier  was torpedoed by the Japanese submarine  and sank southwest of Butaritari Island on 24 November 1943.

Mullinnix was built by the Bethlehem Steel Corporation's Fore River Shipyard in Quincy, Massachusetts, and launched by Mrs. Kathryn F. Mullinnix.

Mullinnix conducted patrol duty in the Caribbean during the Cuban Missile Crisis in 1962, participated in the Gemini program recovery operations in March 1966, and served as plane guard for aircraft carriers on Yankee Station in the Tonkin Gulf, participated in Sea Dragon operations, patrolled on search and rescue duties, and carried out naval gunfire support missions during the Vietnam War.

Mullinix and her sister ship  appeared in The Twilight Zone episode "The Thirty-Fathom Grave."

References

External links
 Website dedicated to the ship
 Website dedicated to the ship
 Website dedicated to the ship's association
 Basic technical parameters and photo gallery

 

Forrest Sherman-class destroyers
Cold War destroyers of the United States
Vietnam War destroyers of the United States
Ships built in Quincy, Massachusetts
Ships sunk as targets
Maritime incidents in 1992
1957 ships